Evermannichthys is a genus of gobies native to the Atlantic coast of the Americas including the Caribbean and the Gulf of Mexico.

Species
There are currently five recognized species in this genus:
 Evermannichthys bicolor Thacker, 2001
 Evermannichthys convictor J. E. Böhlke & C. R. Robins, 1969 (Tenant goby)
 Evermannichthys metzelaari C. L. Hubbs, 1923 (Sponge goby)
 Evermannichthys silus J. E. Böhlke & C. R. Robins, 1969 (Pugnose goby)
 Evermannichthys spongicola (Radcliffe, 1917)

References

Gobiidae